Lamyropsis microcephala is a species of flowering plants in the family Asteraceae.
It is found only on the Italian island of Sardinia.
Its natural habitat is Mediterranean-type shrubby vegetation.
It is threatened by habitat loss.

References

microcephala
Flora of Sardinia
Matorral shrubland
Critically endangered plants
Critically endangered biota of Europe
Plants described in 1843
Taxonomy articles created by Polbot